Let the Wind Erase Me is the first single of the Storm album by Assemblage 23.

In October 2004, it reached #11 on the Billboard Dance Singles sales chart.

Track listing 

 "Let the Wind Erase Me [album version]"
 "Darker"
 "Let the Wind Erase Me [club version]"
 "Tragic Figure"
 "Let the Wind Erase Me [hard version]"

References

2004 singles
2004 songs